Ben Blue (born Benjamin Bernstein; 9 December 1901 – 7 March 1975) was a Canadian-American actor and comedian whose varied career on stage, in movies, and in television appearances, spanned nearly 50 years.

Early life
Benjamin Bernstein was born in Montreal, Quebec on 12 September 1901 to David Asher Bernstein and Sadie (née Goldberg), who were Jewish. He emigrated to Baltimore, Maryland at the age of nine, where he later won a contest for the best impersonation of Charlie Chaplin.

Career
At age fifteen he was in a touring company, and later became a stage manager and assistant general manager. He became a dance instructor and nightclub proprietor. In the 1920s Blue joined a popular orchestra, Jack White and His Montrealers. The entire band emphasized comedy and would continually interact with the joke-cracking maestro. Blue, the drummer, would sometimes deliver corny jokes while wearing a ridiculously false beard. The band relocated to the United States, and appeared in two early sound musicals — the Vitaphone short subject Jack White and His Montrealers and Universal's feature-length 2-strip Technicolor revue King of Jazz (1930).

In 1930, Blue toured with the "Earl Carroll Vanities". He later left the band to establish himself as a solo comedian, portraying a bald-headed dumb-bell with a goofy expression. Around that time he dubbed himself 'Ben Blue', later explaining that it would fit better than 'Bernstein' on theater marquees. Producer Hal Roach featured him in his "Taxi Boys" comedy shorts, but Blue's dopey character was an acquired taste and he was soon replaced by other comedians. Later in the 1930s he worked at Paramount Pictures, notably in The Big Broadcast of 1938, and later at Metro-Goldwyn-Mayer, in films such as Easy to Wed.

In 1950, he had a short-lived TV series, The Ben Blue Show, and was also a regular on The Frank Sinatra Show.

In 1951, Blue began concentrating on managing and appearing in nightclubs in Hollywood, California and San Francisco. He once appeared in a Reno, Nevada nightclub called the Dollhouse where he lost $25,000 to its owner, Bill Welch. Blue and Maxie Rosenbloom owned and performed in Hollywood's top nightclub in the 1940s called "Slapsie Maxie's." Again, in the 1960s he opened a nightclub in Santa Monica, California, called "Ben Blue's".  It quickly became the "in" place and night after night was packed with top celebrities.  Ben closed the club three years later because of health problems. Blue made the cover of TV Guide's 11 June 1954 Special Issue along with Alan Young, headlining an edition that covered that season's summer replacement shows. He also made appearances in TV shows such as The Jack Benny Program and The Milton Berle Show.

In 1958 he had major surgery. In 1958 he starred in a television pilot called Ben Blue's Brothers, in which he played four different parts. The show did not get picked up by a network, but the pilot was seen in 1965.

In 1964 Blue was indicted by a federal grand jury on six counts of tax evasion for the non-payment of more than $39,000 (approximately $ today) in income taxes from the nightclub he operated, the Merry‐Go‐Round, in Santa Monica, California. The case was contested for five years, before he pled no contest to a single count of evading corporate tax. He was fined $1,000, with the payment suspended.

Blue had a recurring role in Jerry Van Dyke's television series Accidental Family in 1967. His film roles included many cameo appearances. In It's a Mad, Mad, Mad, Mad World (1963), he portrayed the pilot of the Standard J-1 biplane that flew Sid Caesar and Edie Adams. In The Russians Are Coming, the Russians Are Coming (1966) he played the town drunk. Other film appearances included small roles in The Busy Body (1967), A Guide for the Married Man (1967) and Where Were You When the Lights Went Out? (1968). He made one of his last television appearances in Land of the Giants in 1969. He was also seen the following year in the Dora Hall vanity syndicated television special, "Once Upon a Tour".

Personal life
Blue married his first wife, Mary, in New York in 1922. They had a daughter, Jeanne, in 1923. Mary was granted a divorce from Blue on 3 December 1937 in Los Angeles. He was ordered to pay $600 (approximately $ today) monthly alimony. The judge told him: "You are no exception to the rule that theatrical careers do not last long, and yours already has been a long one." Blue later married Axie Mae Dunlap (1916—1990). Their two children were sons Tom and Robert.

Death
Blue died in Hollywood, California on March 7, 1975. He was interred in the Hillside Memorial Park Cemetery in Culver City, California.

Legacy
After his death, his career papers covering 1935 to 1955 were deposited in the Special Collections at the University of California, Los Angeles Library.

Filmography

The Arcadians (1927) - Simplicitas Smith
College Holiday (1936) - Stage Hand
Follow Your Heart (1936) - Himself
Turn Off the Moon (1937) - Luke
High, Wide, and Handsome (1937) - Zeke
Artists and Models (1937) - Jupiter Pluvius
Thrill of a Lifetime (1937) - Skipper
The Big Broadcast of 1938 (1938) - Mike
College Swing (1938) - Ben Volt
Cocoanut Grove (1938) - Joe De Lemma
Paris Honeymoon (1939) - Sitska
Panama Hattie (1942) - Rowdy
For Me and My Gal (1942) - Sid Simms
Thousands Cheer (1943) - Chuck Polansky
Broadway Rhythm (1944) - Felix Gross
Two Girls and a Sailor (1944) - Ben
Two Sisters from Boston (1946) - Wrigley
Easy to Wed (1946) - Spike Dolan
My Wild Irish Rose (1947) - Hopper
One Sunday Afternoon (1948) - Nick
It's a Mad, Mad, Mad, Mad World (1963) - Biplane pilot
The Russians Are Coming, the Russians Are Coming (1966) - Luther Grilk
The Busy Body (1967) - Felix Rose
A Guide for the Married Man (1967) - Technical Adviser (Shoeless)
Where Were You When the Lights Went Out? (1968) - Man with a Razor
The Sky's the Limit (1975) - Ben

References

External links

1901 births
1975 deaths
Male actors from Montreal
Canadian emigrants to the United States
Canadian male film actors
Jewish Canadian male actors
Metro-Goldwyn-Mayer contract players
Comedians from Montreal
Vaudeville performers
Burials at Hillside Memorial Park Cemetery
20th-century Canadian male actors
20th-century Canadian comedians
Jews from Quebec